Foum Jamaa is a town in Azilal Province, Béni Mellal-Khénifra, Morocco. According to the 2004 census it has a population of 5,360.

References

Populated places in Azilal Province
Rural communes of Béni Mellal-Khénifra